Juliet JoAnn McKenna (born October 19, 1970) is an associate judge of the Superior Court of the District of Columbia.

Education and career 
McKenna earned a Bachelor of Arts, magna cum laude, from Georgetown University in 1992, and a Juris Doctor from Yale Law School in 1995.

After graduating, she joined the law firm Crowell & Moring for a year. She then went to work in the Office of the D.C. Attorney General. She also taught at the Georgetown University Law Center as an adjunct professor of law.

D.C. superior court 
In April 2002, McKenna was appointed as a magistrate judge on the Superior Court of the District of Columbia pursuant to the Family Court Act of 2001 which created the seat.

On May 20, 2004, President George W. Bush nominated her to serve as an associate judge on the same court. Her nomination expired on December 8, 2004, with the end of the 108th United States Congress.

President Bush renominated her on February 14, 2005, to a 15-year term as an associate judge of the Superior Court of the District of Columbia to the seat vacated by Nan R. Shuker. On September 13, 2005, the Senate Committee on Homeland Security and Governmental Affairs held a hearing on her nomination. On September 22, 2005, the committee reported her nomination favorably to the Senate. On October 7, 2005, the full Senate confirmed her nomination by voice vote. She was sworn in on December 16, 2005.

Personal life 
McKenna was born in Valparaiso, Indiana and raised in Connecticut. In the 1990s, she moved to Washington, D.C. where she has been living since.

References

1970 births
Living people
21st-century American judges
21st-century American women judges
American women academics
Georgetown University alumni
Georgetown University Law Center faculty
Judges of the Superior Court of the District of Columbia
People from Valparaiso, Indiana
Yale Law School alumni